Rufus (also known as Hunted) a Canadian horror film, directed by Dave Schultz and released in 2012. The film stars Rory J. Saper as Rufus, a mysterious young man who turns up in a small town in Saskatchewan and is eventually revealed to be a vampire. The cast also includes David James Elliott, Kelly Rowan, Merritt Patterson, Richard Harmon, and Kim Coates.

The film premiered at the Calgary International Film Festival in September 2012, before going into general theatrical release in 2013.

Plot
Rufus is a mysterious young boy who arrives in a small town in Saskatchewan with an elderly woman. Saying she can go no further, the elderly woman commits suicide by walking in front of a tractor trailer. Hugh Wade, the town sheriff and his wife Jennifer, take him in as their house guest as Sheriff Wade attempts to find out who Rufus and the elderly woman really are and why they suddenly arrived in town. Tracy and Clay are two local teenagers who quickly befriend Rufus. Aaron Van Dusen is a mysterious man who arrives in town looking for Rufus for unknown reasons.

Cast
 Rory J. Saper as Rufus
 Merritt Patterson as Tracy
 David James Elliott as Hugh Wade 
 Kelly Rowan as Jennifer Wade
 Richard Harmon as Clay
 Kim Coates as Aaron Van Dusen
 Tom Carey as Chet
 Nancy Sorel as Vickie
 Christina Jastrzembska as Louise Kettle

Reception
On Rotten Tomatoes the film has an approval rating of 33% based on 6 reviews.

Adam Nayman of the Globe and Mail was critical of the film, saying it " ends up feeling drab as well as looking it." Alexander Lowe of  We Got this Covered felt that Saper's performance as Rufus made for a compelling story but that "just about everything else in the movie knocks it back down to mediocrity." Jay Stone of Canada.com was critical of the slow pace of the film and wrote: "Writer/director Dave Schultz stretches out this somewhat languorous - not to say somnambulant - material to almost two hours by adding a villain."

Bruce DeMara of the Toronto Star gave the film 3 out of 4 and was positive about the slowly building tension and the performances of the actors: "Schultz allows the tension to build slowly and for Rufus's secret history to be revealed in increments. There's also some great interplay between the actors".

Accolades
Erland and the Carnival received two Canadian Screen Award nominations for Best Original Song at the 1st Canadian Screen Awards, for the songs "Wanting" and "Out of Sight".

References

External links
 
  (not rated)
 Rufus'' at Library and Archives Canada

2012 films
English-language Canadian films
Films set in Saskatchewan
Canadian vampire films
Films shot in Saskatchewan
2010s English-language films
2010s Canadian films